Naghash Hovnatan (1661, Shorot, Nakhijevan, Safavid Iran – 1722, Shorot) was an Armenian poet, ashugh, painter, and founder of the Hovnatanian artistic family. He is considered the founder of the new Armenian minstrel school, following medieval Armenian lyric poetry.

Biography

Hovnatan was born to a priestly family in Nakhijevan (at the time part of the Erivan Province in the Safavid Empire) in the village of Shorot. He studied at the Saint Thomas Monastery in Agulis. Hovnatan spent most of his life in Tbilisi and Yerevan and is considered one of the most prominent representatives of late medieval secular Armenian poetry, his work is closest to the work of ashughs. In 1710 he moved to Tbilisi, where, in addition to being a painter, he also became a court ashugh. Hovnatan authored more than a hundred satirical, romantic, drinking, and edifying or admonitory songs and odes.

As a painter, Hovnatan undertook the interior decoration of the Etchmiadzin Cathedral in 1712, which was completed by 1721. The nickname "naghash" means "painter" in Persian.

In 1983, a collection of his poems in Armenian was published in Yerevan.

See also
 Armenian literature
 Music of Armenia
 Hovnatanian family

References

External link

1661 births
1722 deaths
Armenian musicians
Armenian painters
Armenian male poets
17th-century Armenian poets
17th-century Armenian writers
18th-century Armenian poets
18th-century Armenian writers
People from Nakhchivan
Persian Armenians
17th-century writers of Safavid Iran
18th-century writers of Safavid Iran